Oliver Penrose  (born 6 June 1929) is a British theoretical physicist.

He is the son of the scientist Lionel Penrose and brother of the mathematical physicist Roger Penrose, chess Grandmaster Jonathan Penrose, and geneticist Shirley Hodgson. He was associated with the Open University for seventeen years and was a Professor of Mathematics at Heriot-Watt University in Edinburgh from 1986 until his retirement in 1994. He has the title of Professor Emeritus at Heriot-Watt, and remains active in research there. His topics of interest include statistical mechanics, phase transitions in metals and the physical chemistry of surfactants. His concept of off-diagonal long-range order is important to the present understanding of superfluids and superconductors. Other more abstract topics in which he has worked include understanding the physical basis for the direction of time and interpretations of quantum mechanics.

References

External link
Penrose's games at Chessgames.com

English physicists
People from Colchester
Academics of the Open University
Academics of Heriot-Watt University
1929 births
Living people
People from Marylebone
Fellows of the Royal Society
Fellows of the Royal Society of Edinburgh
English people of Russian-Jewish descent
English physical chemists
Theoretical physicists